The East Branch Piscataquis River is a tributary of the Piscataquis River in Piscataquis County, Maine. From its source  in Little Squaw (Maine Township 3, Range 5, BKP EKR), it runs south  to its confluence with the West Branch Piscataquis River in Blanchard to form the Piscataquis.

The Appalachian Trail crosses the East Branch just upstream from its joining with the West Branch.

See also
List of rivers of Maine

References

Maine Streamflow Data from the USGS
Maine Watershed Data From Environmental Protection Agency

Tributaries of the Penobscot River
Rivers of Piscataquis County, Maine
North Maine Woods
Rivers of Maine